Ferdinand Wolfgang Flachenecker (1792–1847) was a German painter.

Biography
Ferdinand Wolfgang Flachenecker was born in Southern Germany in 1792. He worked as a painter and lithographer. He studied at the Royal Danish Academy of Fine Arts in Copenhagen. Later he settled in Munich.

See also
 List of German painters

References

External links

19th-century German painters
19th-century German male artists
German male painters
1847 deaths
1792 births
Royal Danish Academy of Fine Arts alumni